Jasmine Fleming (born 5 November 2004) is an Australian rules footballer playing for the Hawthorn Football Club in the AFL Women's (AFLW). Fleming was recruited by Hawthorn with the second selection in the 2022 AFL Women's draft. She is the daughter of Australian cricketer Damien Fleming.

AFL Women's career
Fleming debuted for the Hawks in the opening round of the 2022 AFL Women's season, playing in their inaugural team fielded against . On debut, she collected 12 disposals and 3 tackles. Fleming earned a rising star nomination in round 5, after a 16 disposal, 10 tackle game against Sydney, seeing her named as one of the team's best on ground.

Statistics
Updated to the end of S7 (2022).

|-
| S7 (2022) ||  || 5
| 9 || 0 || 2 || 86 || 44 || 130 || 11 || 39 || 0.0 || 0.2 || 9.6 || 4.9 || 14.4 || 1.2 || 4.3 || 0
|- class=sortbottom
! colspan=3 | Career
! 9 !! 0 !! 2 !! 86 !! 44 !! 130 !! 11 !! 39 !! 0.0 !! 0.2 !! 9.6 !! 4.9 !! 14.4 !! 1.2 !! 4.3 !! 0
|}

Honours and achievements
Individual
  rising star: S7 (2022)
  record holder for kicks in a game: 19 – S7 (2022)
  record holder for behinds in a game: 2 – S7 (2022) (Tied with Kaitlyn Ashmore, Jess Duffin, and Aileen Gilroy)
  AFL Women's 22under22 team: S7 (2022)
 AFL Women's Rising Star nominee: S7

References

External links
 
 Jasmine Fleming at AustralianFootball.com
 

2004 births
Living people
Hawthorn Football Club (AFLW) players
Australian rules footballers from Victoria (Australia)